Chinazum Ruth Nwosu (born 29 December 1994) is a Nigerian taekwondo practitioner. She won the gold medal in the women's 53 kg event at the 2019 African Games held in Rabat, Morocco. She also won the silver medal in this event at the 2015 African Games held in Brazzaville, Republic of the Congo.

Career 

At the 2016 African Taekwondo Olympic Qualification Tournament held in Agadir, Morocco, she won one of the bronze medals in the women's 57 kg event. In 2017, she competed in the women's bantamweight event at the 2017 World Taekwondo Championships held in Muju, South Korea. She was eliminated in her third match by Tatiana Kudashova of Russia. At the 2018 African Taekwondo Championships held in Agadir, Morocco, she won one of the bronze medals in the women's 53 kg event.

In 2019, she represented Nigeria at the 2019 African Games held in Rabat, Morocco and she won the gold medal in the women's 53 kg event. In the final, she defeated Oumaima El-Bouchti of Morocco. In 2020, she competed in the women's 57 kg event at the 2020 African Taekwondo Olympic Qualification Tournament in Rabat, Morocco. She finished in third place and she did not qualify for the 2020 Summer Olympics in Tokyo, Japan.

Achievements

References

External links 
 

Living people
1994 births
Place of birth missing (living people)
Nigerian female taekwondo practitioners
African Games medalists in taekwondo
African Games gold medalists for Nigeria
African Games silver medalists for Nigeria
Competitors at the 2015 African Games
Competitors at the 2019 African Games
African Taekwondo Championships medalists
20th-century Nigerian women
21st-century Nigerian women